West Delhi Presbyterian Church, Manse, and Cemetery is a historic Presbyterian church complex and cemetery at 18 and 45 Sutherland Road in West Delhi, Delaware County, New York. The church is a one-story, rectangular wood-frame building constructed in 1892.  It is surmounted by a steep gable roof with overhanging eaves.  The manse was built about 1840 and is a large two story wood-frame building with a cross gable plan.  The West Delhi Cemetery contains the graves of most settlement era families and features stones typical of their period and style.

It was added to the National Register of Historic Places in 2008.

See also
 National Register of Historic Places listings in Delaware County, New York

References

External links
 

Presbyterian churches in New York (state)
Churches on the National Register of Historic Places in New York (state)
National Register of Historic Places in Delaware County, New York
Churches completed in 1892
19th-century Presbyterian church buildings in the United States
Churches in Delaware County, New York
Protestant Reformed cemeteries
Cemeteries in Delaware County, New York